Sarah A. Binder is an American Political Scientist, author, senior fellow with the Brookings Institution and serves as professor of political science at George Washington University's Columbian College of Arts and Science.

Early life and education 
Binder graduated with a B.A. in political sciences from Yale University in 1986 and obtained a PhD from the University of Minnesota in 1995.

Career 
Binder started her career serving as Lee Hamilton's legislative aide and press secretary from 1986 to 1990. In 1995, Binder became a research fellow at the Brookings Institution, where she serves as a senior fellow in Governance Studies. She also served as Robert Hartley Research Fellow and in 1999, joined George Washington University, where she serves as a professor of political science today. 

Binder is regularly requested as a political commentator and has been featured in different media outlets for more than two decades.

Works 
Binder has authored and co-authored different books and various publications.

Among her notable works are:

Minority Rights, Majority Rule: Partisanship and the Development of Congress (1997)
Stalemate: Causes and Consequences of Legislative Gridlock (2003)
Advice and Dissent: The Struggle to Shape the Federal Judiciary (together with Forrest Maltzman, 2009)
The Myth of Independence: How Congress Governs the Federal Reserve (together with Mark Spindel, 2017)

Binder served as co-editor of the Wiley Library's publication Legislative Studies Quarterly and also serves as and editor and contributor of the Washington Post's Monkey Cage blog.

Additional affiliations 
Binder is a member of the Center for Effective Public Management and serves as President of the Midwest Political Science Foundation for the 2018–2019 term. She also chairs the MPSA's publishing-ethics committee, which oversees the editorial process at the American Journal of Political Science to guard against conflict-of-interest concerns.

Awards and recognitions 
In 2003, Binder received the American Political Science Association's (APSA) Richard F. Fenno, Jr. Prize, recognizing her book "Stalemate" as the best book in legislative politics.

In 2015, she became an elected member of the American Academy of Arts and Sciences.

In 2018, she was awarded the APSA's Gladys M. Kammerer Award for the best book published in the field of U.S. national policy in 2017.

References

External links

American women political scientists
American political scientists
George Washington University faculty
Columbian College of Arts and Sciences faculty
Yale College alumni
Living people
Year of birth missing (living people)
University of Minnesota alumni
Fellows of the American Academy of Arts and Sciences